Edward Fairchild Watling (8 October 1899 – 6 September 1990) was an English schoolmaster, classicist and translator. He produced translations for Penguin Classics of Sophocles's three Theban plays, nine plays of Plautus and a selection of Seneca's tragedies.

The son of a Denbighshire dairy farmer, Watling was educated at Christ's Hospital and University College, Oxford. He took a Second in Classical Moderations in 1920 and a Third in Literae Humaniores ('"Greats") in 1922.

Watling  taught Classics at King Edward VII School in Sheffield from 1924 until his retirement in 1960. He contributed to amateur dramatics in Sheffield, both as an actor and as a producer, initially for the Sheffield Playgoers and later in Geoffrey Ost's productions at the Sheffield Playhouse. He also wrote sketches for the West End revues of André Charlot, and was a regular reviewer of both books and stage productions for the Sheffield Telegraph. As "Marcus" he compiled  crosswords for The Listener until he was in his seventies.

In 1928 Watling married Cicely Porter (died 1982; one daughter). He died on 6 September 1990.

References

The Independent, Obituaries, 21 September 1990
Material on Old Edwardians site
Penguin books page for Watling

English classical scholars
People educated at Christ's Hospital
Alumni of University College, Oxford
1899 births
1990 deaths
People from Denbighshire
Schoolteachers from Yorkshire